Bannerghatta, Bannergatta, or Bannerughatta may refer to: 
 Bannerghatta (film), 2021 Malayalam language movie starring Karthik Ramakrishnan
 Bannerghatta National Park, a National Park near Bengaluru
 Bannerghatta Road, a Karnataka state highway
 Bannerghatta (town), a village in Jigani hobli, Anekal taluk